Mepe is a title used to designate the Georgian monarch, whether it is a King or a Queen regnant. The word is derived from Georgian word "me-u-pe" which literally means sovereign and lord. Even though mepe has a female equivalent, დედოფალი (dedopali, literally meaning queen) it is only applied to the king's consort and does not have a meaning of a ruling monarch.

Later, after David IV, the official style of Georgian kings became "mepet mepe" (king of kings), similar to the Byzantine "Basileus Basileōn" and Persian Shahanshah. Title Shahanshah was also separately used by Georgian monarchs, denoting sovereignty over several Persianate subjects such as Shirvanshahs and Atabegate of Azerbaijan.

See also 
Eristavi
Batoni
Batonishvili
Aznauri
Mtavari

References 

Royal titles 
Georgian words and phrases
Honorifics
Noble titles of Georgia (country)
Bagrationi dynasty
Monarchs of Georgia